The Apple Expo was a European annual sales conference and technology exposition held by Apple Inc. The conference featured over 250 exhibitors annually, with Apple being its main exhibitor. This conference was most often viewed as the European counterpart to MacWorld Expo, a similar conference that was held annually in San Francisco.

History 
The Apple Expo event was originally invented and held in France around 1984 by the employees of the French Apple distributor Seedrin Sarl, and its manager  Jean-Louis Gassée.
All the employees of this small distributor were each time involved in participating for this annual show, where several third party software and hardware distributors would also have their booth. 
Apple Seedrin (which turned to Apple France) continued for decades to organise this event every mid September. Within the small (100 people) Apple France subsidiary, a team was even created (with Adeline Domenjoz) to set up this event. 
Due to the growing size of the event, Reed OIP was contracted for show management.

Around the turn to the 21st century, the Apple corporation took the ownership of the Apple Expo organisation, and Steve Jobs included this recurring date in his possible events list. With this new corporate management, the French subsidiary employees slowly stopped being be part of the booth demo team. 
The last years showed that the event was slowly turning into an iPod expo, more than a Mac one. Year after year, Apple stopped releasing new products during this event, removing much of its booth investments, and limited the amount of available new products on show. 
The last issue was a Reed Expositions-only event, without even an Apple booth.

There were other similar events held in Europe, like MacExpo in London, but with no link with the Apple Expo.

Below there is a time line of all significant product announcements announced at the Apple Expo:

Timeline

External links
Former Apple Expo Official Site
MacWorld Expo Official Site
Apple Expo 2003 - Keynote Photos

Computer-related trade shows
Apple Inc. conferences